Elzey is a surname. Notable people with the surname include:

Arnold Elzey (1816–1871), American soldier
Paul Elzey (1946–1989), American football Linebacker

See also
Ellzey